Willi Gundlach (born 15 May 1929) is a German choral conductor and academic. He taught at the music department of the Technical University of Dortmund. He researched and edited works by Fanny Hensel-Mendelssohn. He founded and conducted a chamber choir at the university and recorded with them, including operas for the Kurt Weill Foundation. After his retirement from teaching, he cofounded and organised a concert series at St. Peter, Syburg, including organ concerts and vocal concerts with notable performers.

Career 
Born in Oberhausen, Gundlach studied first to be an elementary teacher at the Pädagogische Hochschule (PH, School of education) in Braunschweig. He studied to be a teacher of higher education in Hanover, at both the Musikhochschule and the Technical University. He studied musicology in Kiel and at the Cologne University, promoted to Ph.D. in 1969.

Gundlach first taught at the PH Flensburg, then from 1963 at the PH Dortmund. In 1980, he was appointed professor of music and its pedagogy ("Musik und ihre Didaktik") at the Technical University of Dortmund. He published several books on his topics, including  studies of Fanny Hensel-Mendelssohn. In 1977, he founded the chamber choir of the university (Kammerchor der Universität Dortmund) and conducted it until 2005, although he retired from teaching in 1994. He conducted the choir of the university from 1976 to 1995. In 1985, he founded an international week of music, Campus cantat (The campus sings), which he directed to 2001.

Gundlach recorded choral music with the Kammerchor, including works by Hugo Distler und Fanny Hensel-Mendelssohn. He conducted a recording of Distler's Choralpassion, Op. 7, for soloists and five-part choir a cappella, with Peter Kooy as vox Christi, Wilfried Jochens as the Evangelist, and Gerrit Miehlke as Pilate. He recorded in 1990 two operas by Kurt Weill for the Kurt Weill Foundation, with soloists, the Kammerchor and orchestra, Der Jasager, written in 1930, and Down in the Valley, written in 1948.

The series began in 1998 with the inauguration of a new organ. Performers have included Heinz Wunderlich, a pupil of Karl Straube and a professor in Hamburg, the composer and organist Wolfgang Stockmeier, professor of organ and improvisation at the Musikhochschule Köln, and Hatto Ständer who taught organ at the Dortmund University. Among the vocal groups were, besides the Kammerchor, the Alsfelder Vokalensemble, conducted by Wolfgang Helbich, and the Kettwiger Bach-Ensemble, conducted by Wolfgang Kläsener. The 100th concert was given in 2012.

Gundlach organised an Offenes Kantatensingen (Open cantata singing) as part of the concert series, regularly on the Second Sunday in Advent, calling volunteer singers to an all-day rehearsal the day before, and a rehearsal with soloists and orchestra, mostly students of the university. He moderated the event in the candle-lit church, conducting all who gathered in singing Advent songs and rounds, and conducting the cantata with the prepared project group. After a start in 1998 with varied choral music for Christmas, the programming was more and more ambitious. In 1999, Dieterich Buxtehude's Magnificat was performed, among others. In 2000 the first Bach cantata was tried, Nun komm, der Heiden Heiland, BWV 61, followed in 2001 by Herz und Mund und Tat und Leben, BWV 147, and in 2002 by Wachet auf, ruft uns die Stimme, BWV 140. In 2003, the ensemble performed a Magnificat in G major by Georg Philipp Telemann, while in 2004, the prepared cantata was Part VI from Bach's Christmas Oratorio, Fallt mit Danken. In 2005, Gundlach conducted the Oratorio de Noël by Camille Saint-Saëns. The choice of 2006 was Part I from Handel's Messiah, covering Advent and Christmas.  In 2007 Gundlach selected Part III from the Christmas Oratorio, beginning "Herrscher des Himmels, erhöre das Lallen", in 2008 when the series celebrated its 10th anniversary, Part I, beginning "Jauchzet, frohlocket!". Gundlach then passed the cantata series to younger musicians, but conducted one more Bach cantata in the 100th concert on 6 May 2012, the congratulatory cantata BWV 207, however with a new text written for the occasion by Martin Geck.

References

External links 
 
 Sina Hosbach: Das Liederbuch in der Grundschule: Eine multidimensionale Bestandsaufnahme
  R. Larry Todd: Fanny Hensel: The Other Mendelssohn
 Willi Gundlach (ed): Hensel, Fanny geb. Mendelssohn / Zum Fest der Heiligen Caecilia (Chorpartitur) Furore Verlag
 Syburger Sonntagsmusiken
 Willi Gundlach: CAMPUS CANTAT 1085 – 2001 / Der Glanz der Musik und die dezente Mitwirkung der Administration in Bürokratie und Subversion: die Universität in der permanenten Reform auf dem Weg zu sich selbst : eine Streitschrift zum 65. Geburtstag von Dietrich Groh

Academic staff of the Technical University of Dortmund
German choral conductors
German male conductors (music)

People from Oberhausen
Living people
1929 births
21st-century German conductors (music)
21st-century German male musicians